Brown Chapel A.M.E. Church located at 1400 Boyle Street in the Central Northside neighborhood of Pittsburgh, Pennsylvania, was built in 1903.   This African Methodist Episcopal Church was added to the List of Pittsburgh History and Landmarks Foundation Historic Landmarks in 1988.

References

Churches in Pittsburgh
Churches completed in 1903
20th-century Methodist church buildings in the United States
African Methodist Episcopal churches in Pennsylvania
Methodist churches in Pennsylvania
Chapels in the United States